Ceroli is an Italian surname. Notable people with the surname include:

Mario Ceroli (born 1938), Italian sculptor
Nick Ceroli (1939–1985), American jazz drummer

See also
Caroli (surname)

Italian-language surnames